The lateral epicondyle of the femur, smaller and less prominent than the medial epicondyle, gives attachment to the fibular collateral ligament of the knee-joint. Directly below it is a small depression from which a smooth well-marked groove curves obliquely upward and backward to the posterior extremity of the condyle.

References

External links
 
 

Bones of the lower limb
Femur